Henry Polsted (by 1510 – 10 December 1555) of Albury, Surrey, was an English politician.

Family
He was the brother of MP for Great Bedwyn, Thomas Polsted, and the father of MP for Hindon, Richard Polsted.

Career
He was a Member (MP) of the Parliament of England for Bletchingley in 1547 and October 1553 and for Guildford in November 1554 and 1555.

References

1555 deaths
1500s births
People from the Borough of Guildford
English MPs 1547–1552
English MPs 1553 (Mary I)
English MPs 1554–1555
English MPs 1555